A by-election was held for the New South Wales Legislative Assembly seat of Casino on 29 February 1964. It was triggered by the resignation of Ian Robinson who had won the federal seat of Cowper at the 1963 election.

Dates

Result

See also
Electoral results for the district of Casino
List of New South Wales state by-elections

References

1964 elections in Australia
New South Wales state by-elections
1960s in New South Wales
February 1964 events in Australia